Berivotra is a rural municipality in Madagascar. It belongs to the district of Maevatanana, which is a part of Betsiboka Region. The population of the municipality was 14,675 in 2018.

Infrastructure
It is situated on the Route Nationale 4 from Antananarivo to Mahajanga (230 km). It is found at 32 km from 32 km Maevatanana.

Economy
Principal activity is gold digging in the Ikalamilotra river.

References

Populated places in Betsiboka